Catharina "Toos" Maria van der Klaauw (4 December 1915 – 11 August 2011) was a Dutch fencer. She competed in the women's individual foil event at the 1936 Summer Olympics.

References

External links
 

1915 births
2011 deaths
Dutch female foil fencers
Olympic fencers of the Netherlands
Fencers at the 1936 Summer Olympics
Sportspeople from The Hague